The 2022 EAFF E-1 Football Championship was an association football tournament organized by the East Asian Football Federation. It was the 8th edition of the EAFF E-1 Football Championship, the football championship of East Asia. The finals were originally scheduled to be held in China, but it was announced on 19 April 2022 that Japan would host the finals. It was Japan's third time hosting the tournament.

There were no preliminary rounds conducted. After North Korea withdrew from the competition, the remaining slot for the participating teams was awarded to Chinese Taipei based upon the FIFA rankings as of 31 March 2022. The other teams were China PR and South Korea.

Table

Matches

Goalscorers

See also
 2022 EAFF E-1 Football Championship (ｍen)
 2022 AFF Women's Championship
 2022 CAFA Women's Championship
 2022 SAFF Women's Championship
 2022 WAFF Women's Championship
 2022 AFC Women's Asian Cup

References

External links
 EAFF E-1 Football Championship 2022 Final Japan, eaff.com
 Competition schedule (PDF), eaff.com

2022
East Asian Cup
EAFF
EAFF
International women's association football competitions hosted by Japan
EAFF